Tisis is a genus of small moths in the family Lecithoceridae. The genus was erected by Francis Walker in 1864.

Species
Tisis amabilis Park, 2003
Tisis argyrophaea Meyrick, 1910
Tisis asterias Park, 2003
Tisis aurantiella Park, 2003
Tisis auricincta Diakonoff, 1967
Tisis aurifasciata Park, 2007
Tisis bicolorella Walker, 1864
Tisis boleta C. S. Wu, 1998
Tisis cerambycina Meyrick, 1926
Tisis chalybaeella (Walker, 1864)
Tisis charadraea Meyrick, 1910
Tisis colubrialis Park, 2005
Tisis diehli Park, 2007
Tisis elegans (Snellen, 1903)
Tisis eurylampis Meyrick, 1910
Tisis frimensis Park, 2005
Tisis gloriosa Park, 2009
Tisis helioclina Meyrick, 1894
Tisis hemixysta Meyrick, 1910
Tisis hyacinthina Meyrick, 1910
Tisis imperatrix Meyrick, 1910
Tisis isoplasta Meyrick, 1929
Tisis javaica Park, 2007
Tisis latiductalis Park, 2005
Tisis luteella (Snellen, 1903)
Tisis meliorella Walker, 1864
Tisis mendicella (Walker, 1864)
Tisis mesozosta Meyrick, 1914
Tisis nemophorella Walker, 1864
Tisis nielseni Park, 2001
Tisis penrissenica Park, 2005
Tisis plautata C. S. Wu, 1998
Tisis polemarcha Meyrick, 1926
Tisis polychlora Meyrick, 1926
Tisis sabahensis Park, 2003
Tisis sandaradema C. S. Wu, 1998
Tisis seclusella (Walker, 1864)
Tisis sophistica Park, 2003
Tisis sumatraensis Park, 2007
Tisis thaiana Park, 2003
Tisis xantholepidos Park, 2007
Tisis yasudai Park, 2003

References

 
Lecithocerinae
Moth genera